This is a list of years in Oman.

16th century

17th century

18th century

19th century

20th century

21st century

See also
 Timeline of Muscat, Oman

 
History of Oman
Oman-related lists
Oman